Selby and Ainsty is a constituency in North Yorkshire represented in the House of Commons of the UK Parliament since its 2010 creation by Nigel Adams, a member of the Conservative Party.

History

For 2010 the Boundary Commission recommended the creation of this seat following a review of parliamentary representation in York and North Yorkshire. The constituency was formed from the former Selby constituency, except for some villages near York which were moved to the new York Outer constituency, and rural areas south and east of Harrogate which were previously in the Vale of York constituency.

As of the 2019 general election, the seat has been won by the Conservative Party by a successively larger set of majorities each time it has been contested, though the 2017 general election had the unusual result of the Conservatives slightly increasing their majority despite a slight swing towards the Labour Party, mostly due to significantly higher turnout.

Boundaries
The constituency comprises:

The entire District of Selby
The electoral wards of Marston Moor, Ouseburn, Ribston and Spofforth with Lower Wharfedale in the Borough of Harrogate

Constituency profile

The constituency is mainly rural. The only towns are Selby and Tadcaster. The rural areas include parts of the ancient wapentake of the Ainsty of York.
In statistics
The constituency consists of Census Output Areas of two local government districts with similar characteristics: a working population whose income is close to the national average and lower than average reliance upon social housing.  At the end of 2012 the unemployment rate in the constituency stood as 2.2% of the population claiming jobseekers allowance, compared to the regional average of 4.7%. The district contributing to the bulk of the seat has a low 14.5% of its population without a car, 21.2% of the population without qualifications and a relatively high 26.1% with level 4 qualifications or above.  In terms of tenure 75.0% of homes are owned outright or on a mortgage by occupants as at the 2011 census across the Selby district.

Members of Parliament

Elections

Elections in the 2010s

See also
List of parliamentary constituencies in North Yorkshire

Notes

References

Parliamentary constituencies in Yorkshire and the Humber
Constituencies of the Parliament of the United Kingdom established in 2010